Snethlage's tody-tyrant (Hemitriccus minor) is a species of bird in the family Tyrannidae. It is found in Bolivia, Brazil, and Venezuela.
Its natural habitat is subtropical or tropical moist lowland forests. Its name commemorates the German-born Brazilian naturalist and ornithologist Emilie Snethlage (1868-1929).

References

Snethlage's tody-tyrant
Birds of the Amazon Basin
Snethlage's tody-tyrant
Snethlage's tody-tyrant
Taxonomy articles created by Polbot